Union Sportive de Ben Guerdane or USBG, is a Tunisian football club, based in the city of Ben Guerdane in southeast Tunisia. Founded on 1 March 1936, the team plays in yellow and black colors. Their ground is Stade du 7 Mars, which has a capacity of 10,000.

He managed to reach for the first time in its history in Tunisian Professional League 1 during the season 2015. The club is chaired in 2016 by Mehdi Dbouba with which the team took a new dimension both on the national and continental level.

Honours and achievements

Players

First-team squad

Club Officials

Board of directors

Current technical staff

References

Football clubs in Tunisia
Association football clubs established in 1936
 
1936 establishments in Tunisia
Sports clubs in Tunisia
Ben Gardane